The Saigon River Tunnel, more popular in Vietnam as the Thu Thiem Tunnel is an underwater tunnel that opened on November 20, 2011. It runs underneath the Saigon River in Ho Chi Minh City, the largest city of Vietnam. The tunnel was built with capital from JICA's ODA, in conjunction with a consortium of Japanese contractors. The tunnel connects the existing urban center of Ho Chi Minh City with Thu Thiem New Urban Area in Thủ Đức. The existing downtown was previously only linked with the Thu Thiem New Urban Area by many bridges, namely: Thủ Thiêm Bridge, Phú Mỹ Bridge and Ba Son Bridge.

External links and references

DECISION No. 622/QD-TTg OF JULY 5, 2000 RATIFYING THE INVESTMENT IN THE PROJECT FOR BUILDING THE EAST-WEST AVENUE IN HO CHI MINH CITY by Vietnamese Prime Minister

Transport in Ho Chi Minh City
Saigon River
2010 in Vietnam
Road tunnels in Vietnam
Tunnels completed in 2011
Buildings and structures in Ho Chi Minh City